Balls of Steel is a pinball computer game developed by Wildfire Studios and released on December 12, 1997. It is the only game to be published under the Pinball Wizards label, a division of Apogee Software (today known as 3D Realms).

When the game was originally released, it was possible to upload high scores to the WorldScores server, for a global ranking. This feature has since been discontinued.

Tables
Balls of Steel features five original pinball tables:
Darkside: Set on a remote space station under attack by alien creatures.
Barbarian: A classic medieval fantasy quest with a huge dragon on the table.
Firestorm: Set in a crime-ridden US city, a mad bomber is on the loose.
Mutation: Set in an underground science lab where a bio-hazardous accident has occurred and a large, slimy monster has taken over the lab.
Duke Nukem: A special table featuring the Apogee video game character Duke Nukem.

Another table, Devil's Island, was dropped from the game when Wildfire was given the opportunity by Apogee to include a Duke Nukem table. Devil's Island was later released as a standalone game.

Duke Nukem tie-in
The game includes a table based on the Apogee/3D Realms video game Duke Nukem 3D including graphics from that game and original voice-overs by Nukem actor Jon St. John. Pinball missions include fighting monsters like octabrains and pig-cops, and using powerups such as jetpacks and the Holoduke, from the Duke Nukem 3D video game.

Graphics of a pinball game named Balls of Steel appear in Duke Nukem 3D itself, in the first level, "Hollywood Holocaust", when Duke encounters the table. Balls of Steel reappears in Duke Nukem Forever.

Development
Balls of Steel was in development since 1995. The game was showcased at E3 1997.

Reception
Balls of Steel was a finalist for Computer Games Strategy Pluss 1998 "Classic Game of the Year" award, which ultimately went to Centipede. The editors wrote that Balls of Steel "demonstrated that you can do the Bally table on the PC, and do it well."

References

External links
Official website
Balls of Steel on MobyGames

Classic Mac OS games
Windows games
Pinball video games
1997 video games
3D Realms games
Video games scored by Bobby Prince
Video games developed in Australia